Omari Shaquil Jabari Sterling-James (born 15 September 1993) is a footballer who plays as a winger or forward for Ebbsfleet United and the Saint Kitts and Nevis national team.

He previously played in the Football League for Cheltenham Town and Mansfield Town, and in non-League football for Alvechurch, Redditch United, Oxford City, Gloucester City, Solihull Moors, Brackley Town and Kettering Town and in 2021 he signed for Ebbsfleet United. Born in England, Sterling-James plays international football for Saint Kitts and Nevis.

Career
Sterling-James began his career with Birmingham City, and was released in the 2012 summer. Shortly after he moved to Midland Football Alliance club Alvechurch, and scored 11 goals in his first season.

In September 2013 Sterling-James moved to Redditch United of the Southern League. He appeared regularly with the side, also scoring 13 goals during the whole campaign.

During a trial with League Two club Cheltenham Town, Sterling-James impressed in the pre-season friendlies and on 21 July 2014, he signed a six-month deal.

He made his professional debut on 12 August in the League Cup, as a late substitute in a 2–0 loss away to Brighton & Hove Albion. In December, he signed an extended deal to run until June 2016. He made 22 league appearances, scoring once, in Cheltenham's 2014–15 season, at the end of which the team were relegated to the National League.

Sterling-James spent the first half of the following season on loan at Oxford City of the National League South. In December 2015, Cheltenham confirmed that he was one of seven players whose contracts would not be renewed. On his return to his parent club, he made one appearance, in the FA Trophy, before joining National League North club Gloucester City on 4 February 2016 on loan until the end of the season.

Sterling-James signed for Solihull Moors, newly promoted to the National League, in July 2016. He scored, and was named man of the match, on his debut in a 3–1 victory over Sutton United. At the end of December he signed a new contract, and he finished the season with 9 goals from 46 appearances.

Although Moors wanted to keep Sterling-James at the club, he was determined to return to the Football League, and he signed for League Two club Mansfield Town on a free transfer. By mid-January 2018, he had failed to score in twenty appearances, only two of which were league starts, and he rejoined Solihull Moors on 22 March on loan until the end of the season. He played in three more Mansfield matches before a proposed loan move to Boston United fell through and he finished the 2018–19 season on loan to Brackley Town of the National League South, where he played little. On his return to Mansfield he again struggled for game time, joined Kettering Town on loan shortly before the National League was suspended because of the COVID-19 pandemic, and was released when his contract expired.

Sterling-James signed for Kidderminster Harriers in September 2020, He played in all but one of their National League North matches before the season was ended early because of COVID-19. He was a regular in Kidderminster's side in 2021–22, and contributed to their FA Cup run: entering at the second qualifying round, they beat Championship team Reading to reach the fourth round, in which they led Premier League team West Ham United until stoppage time before losing in extra time.

International career
Sterling-James received his first international call-up to the Saint Kitts and Nevis national team for friendly against Armenia and Georgia on 4 and 7 June 2017. He played in both gamesboth defeats, He scored his first goal for Saint Kitts and Nevis in a 10–0 win against Saint Martin in the 2019–20 CONCACAF Nations League qualifying rounds.

Career statistics

International goals
Scores and results list Saint Kitts and Nevis' goal tally first. Score column lists the score after each Sterling-James goal.

References

External links
Cheltenham Town profile via archive.org

1993 births
Living people
English sportspeople of Saint Kitts and Nevis descent
Footballers from Birmingham, West Midlands
Black British sportspeople
English footballers
Saint Kitts and Nevis footballers
Association football wingers
Alvechurch F.C. players
Redditch United F.C. players
Cheltenham Town F.C. players
Oxford City F.C. players
Gloucester City A.F.C. players
Solihull Moors F.C. players
Mansfield Town F.C. players
Brackley Town F.C. players
Kettering Town F.C. players
Kidderminster Harriers F.C. players
Ebbsfleet United F.C. players
English Football League players
National League (English football) players
Saint Kitts and Nevis international footballers